Robert Cochran Duncan (4 October 1887 – 4 May 1957) was a British sprinter who competed in the 100 metres and 200 metres.  He competed at the 1908 Summer Olympics in London at the 1912 Summer Olympics in Stockholm. He was born in Glasgow.

In the 100 metres, Duncan won his first round heat with a time of 11.4 seconds to advance to the semifinals.  There, he finished fourth and last in his semifinal heat to be eliminated. He was not as successful in the 200 metres.  His time of 23.1 seconds put him in second place behind Georges Malfait and eliminated him from competition.

References

Sources
 
 
 

1887 births
1957 deaths
Athletes (track and field) at the 1908 Summer Olympics
Athletes (track and field) at the 1912 Summer Olympics
Olympic athletes of Great Britain
Sportspeople from Glasgow
British male sprinters
Scottish male sprinters